The Central District of Borkhar County is a district (bakhsh) in Borkhar County, Isfahan Province, Iran. The District has four cities: Dowlatabad, Khvorzuq, Dastgerd & Sin. At the 2006 census, its population was 73,315, in 19,071 families.  The District has one rural district (dehestan): Borkhar-e Markazi Rural District.

References 

Borkhar County
Districts of Isfahan Province